The Paulding-class destroyers were a series of United States Navy destroyers derived from the  with the torpedo tubes increased from three to six via twin mounts. They were the first destroyers in the US Navy with oil-fired boilers. The 21 Pauldings doubled the number of destroyers in the US Navy. The Paulding class derived its name from the class's lead ship, named for Rear Admiral Hiram Paulding (1797–1878). Like the Smiths, they were nicknamed "flivvers" after the small and shaky Model T Ford once the larger "thousand tonner" destroyers entered service.

Generally 21 ships, hull numbers 22 through 42, are considered Pauldings. However, some references list hull numbers 32 through 42 as the Monaghan class. Others break out hulls 24–28, 30, 31, 33 and 36 as Roe class, with hulls 32, 35, and 38–42 as Monaghan class.  Curiously, Jane's Fighting Ships of World War I refers to hulls 22–42 as the 21 [ships of the] Drayton class, going on to say "Unofficially known as 'Flivver Type'"; the book includes Paulding in the class listing, but not as the class leader.

Design

Armament

The torpedo armament was six 18-inch (450 mm) torpedo tubes in three twin mounts. This was an easy upgrade from the three single tubes with reloads of the Smith class, as the new design twin mounts actually weighed less than the older single mounts. The gun armament was the same as the Smith class, with five /50 caliber guns. During World War I, one or two depth charge tracks were equipped for the convoy escort mission.

Engineering

There was some variation in engineering among the ships of this class. The most visible was that hulls 24–27, 30–32, 34, 36, 37, 39, and 40 had three stacks instead of four, with the middle stack being larger as two boiler uptakes were trunked together in it. Most of the ships' direct drive turbines were arranged as in the Smith class on three shafts, with a high-pressure center turbine exhausting to two low-pressure turbines on the outboard shafts. Cruising turbines were also fitted on the outboard shafts in these ships to improve fuel economy at low speeds. However, hulls 26–27, 30–31, and 34 had two turbines on two shafts (Zoelly or Curtis), with cruising stages included in the turbine casings.

This was the first USN destroyer class with oil-fired boilers. From DD-32 on, most references state that Thornycroft boilers instead of Normand were equipped. However, the Navy's official Ships' Data Book for 1911 shows that other types of boilers were used as well, including Yarrow and White-Forster.

Service

The Pauldings were commissioned in 1910–1912 and were active throughout World War I, primarily as convoy escorts in the Atlantic. They were equipped with one or two depth charge tracks for this mission. All served in the United States Navy; twelve were transferred to the United States Coast Guard 1924–30 for the Rum Patrol; and all were scrapped 1934–35 to comply with the London Naval Treaty.

Ships in class

Gallery

See also

References

Bibliography

External links
Tin Can Sailors @ Destroyers.org - Paulding class destroyer
DestroyerHistory.org Paulding class destroyer
DestroyerHistory.org Flivver type destroyers
NavSource Destroyer Photo Index Page
DiGiulian, Tony Navweaps.com 3"/50 Mks 2, 3, 5, 6, and 8
DiGiulian, Tony Navweaps.com Pre-WWII US Torpedoes
US Navy Torpedo History, part 2 

Destroyer classes